Dobroteasa is a commune in Olt County, Muntenia, Romania. It is composed of four villages: Batia, Câmpu Mare, Dobroteasa, and Vulpești.

Natives
 Virgil Calotescu

References

Communes in Olt County
Localities in Muntenia